Julio Lores Colán (born 15 September 1908 - death 15 July 1947) was a Peruvian-Mexican professional football forward who played for Peru in the 1930 FIFA World Cup and for Mexico. He played for Ciclista Lima, and later for the Mexican club Necaxa. He also was part of “Los Once Hermanos” (“The Eleven Brothers”).

Honours
International
Central American and Caribbean Games Gold Medal: 1935, 1938

References

External links
11v11 profile
FIFA profile

1908 births
1947 deaths
People from Lima Region
Association football forwards
Peruvian footballers
Peru international footballers
Ciclista Lima Association footballers
Club Necaxa footballers
1930 FIFA World Cup players
Peruvian emigrants to Mexico
Mexican footballers
Mexico international footballers
Dual internationalists (football)
Central American and Caribbean Games gold medalists for Mexico
Competitors at the 1935 Central American and Caribbean Games
Competitors at the 1938 Central American and Caribbean Games
Central American and Caribbean Games medalists in football